Jianxing may refer to:

Townships in China
Jianxing Township, Sichuan, in Zitong County, Sichuan
Jianxing Township, Yunnan, in Xinping Yi and Dai Autonomous County, Yunnan

Historical eras
Jianxing (223–237), era name used by Liu Shan, emperor of Shu Han
Jianxing (252–253), era name used by Sun Liang, emperor of Eastern Wu
Jianxing (313–317), era name used by Emperor Min of Jin, later continued by Former Liang rulers until 361 (except for a brief interruption 354–355)
Jianxing (386–396), era name used by Murong Chui, emperor of Later Yan
Jianxing (819–830), or Geonheung, era name used by Seon of Balhae

People
Wei Jianxing, Chisese statesman.